Shannon Chan-Kent (born September 23, 1988) is a Canadian voice and stage actress. She is known for her roles as Silver Spoon and Smolder and the singing voice of Pinkie Pie in My Little Pony: Friendship Is Magic, Misa Amane in the English dub of Death Note, and the Biskit twins and Youngmee Song on Littlest Pet Shop. She also portrays Joy Pepper in the rebooted Superbook, the Chief in Pucca, Courtney's best friend Janet in Spectacular!, and Amy Rose in Sonic Prime.

In addition to her voice acting career, she is also an opera singer (Soprano), having graduated with bachelor's and master's degrees in Opera from the University of British Columbia. Shannon has performed with the Vancouver Metropolitan Orchestra as well as with local theater productions.

Filmography

Animation
16 Hudson – Mrs. Wu, Joyce
Adventures of Ayuma - Noxana
Barbie: A Fashion Fairytale – Delphine
Barbie: Princess Charm School – Princess Isla
Barbie & Her Sisters in A Pony Tale – Marie
Barbie in A Christmas Carol – Ann, Nan
Barbie in A Mermaid Tale – Deandra
Barbie: Video Game Hero – Renee, Maia
Barbie: Dolphin Magic – Isla
Beat Bugs – Freda (episode: All Together Now)
Being Ian – Grace Chou Lum, Nurse Bradley, Hoop Earrings Student
Care Bears: Big Wish Movie – Love-a-Lot Bear
Care Bears: Adventures in Care-a-lot – Tweazle, Friend Bear,  Birthday Bear
Care Bears: The Giving Festival – Tweazle, Friend Bear, Birthday Bear, Love-a-Lot Bear
Care Bears to the Rescue – Tweazle
Chuck's Choice – Ms. Cho, Principal Principle
Class of the Titans – Lydia
Corner Gas Animated – 60's Girl No. 1, Alison, Lin, Bu-Hu
Dinosaur Train – Allie Alamosaurus
Dinotrux – Knock-Itt, Ankylodump No. 2 (5)
Dr. Dimensionpants – Rebecca
Duck on Call - Millie Mechanic
Fast & Furious: Spy Racers - Film Director
Fruit Ninja: Frenzy Force – Niya
Fluffy Bunch – Catie Cat, Katelyn Katt, Kaylee Chihuahua, Krystal Heart, Skyla Cattrick
Ghost Patrol – Harper Avery, Aunt Lulabell
Hydee and the Hytops – Mariko
Hatchimals: Hatchtopia Life – Kitwee, Carrot Cake Bunwee, Kittycan, Rainbow Foxfin, Scrunch Unikeet, Breadcat, Coffee Cake Owlicorn, Cheesecake Mousecan, Rainbow Hamster, Other Hatchimals
Hatchimals Colleggtibles: Goes To School – Twins Kittycan, Owling, Other Hatchimals 
Kong: King of the Apes – Dr. Amy Quon
Littlest Pet Shop – Brittany Biskit, Whittany Biskit, Youngmee Song, Mrs. Biskit, Madison, Phoebe,  Brittman Biskit, Whittman Biskit, Furry Fury, Whale
Littlest Pet Shop: A World of Our Own – Yamua Beetlemoto, Penelope Puggerson, Rima Rhymalayan, Millie McMallard, Pearl the Salon Cat, Russian Blue Cat, Lola Butterflew, Ray, Pinka Carrots, Ittybit, Owl Bunny, Vicky Cattily, Kate Cattily, Madame Fluffkins, Scrapper #4, Yellow The Salon Cat, Amber Kittyson, Lavander Catkin, Baby Jade Catkin, Buttercup Catkin, Phoenix Catkin, Adult Sonia,  Dottie Cheetahstein, Sada Persiafluff, Zombie Cat, Sada Scootsfield, Fluffy Catson, Bella Scootsfield, Sugarberry Fluffcat, Hima Himalaya, Annie Coldhare, Rei Angelfish, Sherbet Bunnyton, Poco La Playa, Katie Perrito, Perky Peacoat, Banfoe McCatty, Dessert Bunnyton, Cleo Curlycat, Catalina Scrapper, Jan Bunnyton Alabaster Scottsfold, Glowy Meow, Maggie Lemoncat, Lila Pearly, Whimsy, Mei Tanpaws, Kissies, Ocean Cattily, Flower Cattily, Wynter Cattily
Littlest Pet Shop: Hungry Pets – Pickles Catbury
Littlest Pet Shop: Hungry Pets: Special Edition – Pickles Catbury in Hot Pink
Littlest Pet Shop: Keep Me Pack – Sailor Sue, Tornado Tom, Dinette, Honeydipper, Misty Moonlight, Rock Garden, Lynx, Tiger, Bento, Lemon Fluff, Ice Capper, Sally Sea, Snow Crystal, Windswept, Hurdy Gurdy, Maine Coon Cat, Kitten Cat, Bunny, Polar Bear, Snoops, Babbling Brook, Nell, Rhymer, Hazy Daze
Littlest Pet Shop: Lucky Pets – Evening, Gwynnie, Arturo, Sweet Violet, Gazer, Pipsy, Mila, Cat Shorthair, Platypus, Bunny, Collette, Bandy, Pizazz, Cheesecake, Lyric, Brant, Davi, Doyle, Loy, Merle, Mousse, Hazy, Tarot, Presto, Starzy, Twixie, Wandelle, Zulia, Green Mouse, Orange Cat, Pink Cat, Blue Beagle, Dark Blue Peacock, White Polar Bear, Purple Lynx, Orange Sugar Glider,  Moonstone, Boho, Compass, Sugar Cookie, Rosemary, Summer, Ribbon, Red Velvet, Seasons, Niles
Lady Jewelpet – Garnet (English version), Diana (English version), Sango (English version), Lapis (English version)
Madeline: My Fair Madeline – Chloe
Madeline: Madeline in Tahiti – Chloe
Maryoku Yummy – Maryoku
Mega Man: Fully Charged – Ashley Adderley
My Little Pony: Equestria Girls (2013 film) – Pinkie Pie (singing voice)
My Little Pony: Equestria Girls (2017 television specials) – Lemon Zest
My Little Pony: Equestria Girls – Rainbow Rocks – Pinkie Pie (singing voice)
My Little Pony: Equestria Girls – Friendship Games – Pinkie Pie (singing voice), Lemon Zest
My Little Pony: Equestria Girls – Legend of Everfree – Pinkie Pie (singing voice)
My Little Pony: Equestria Girls – Forgotten Friendship – Pinkie Pie (singing voice), Wallflower Blush
My Little Pony: The Movie – Pinkie Pie (singing voice)
My Little Pony: Equestria Girls – Sunset's Backstage Pass – Pinkie Pie (singing voice), Sonata Dusk (singing voice)
My Little Pony: Friendship Is Magic – Pinkie Pie (singing voice on most songs), Silver Spoon, Smolder, Aura, Roma, Citrus Blush, Cayenne, Vendor, Hippogriff Sailor, Tootsie Flute, Girl Pony, Posh Pony, Fashionable Pony, Student 2, Ocellus  (singing voice), Raspberry Dazzle
My Little Pony: Rainbow Roadtrip – Pinkie Pie (singing voice)
My Little Pony: Pony Life – Cowgirl Pony, Butterscotch, Spring Parade, Angel
Nerds and Monsters – Org
Ninjago: Masters of Spinjitzu – Racer Seven, Hostess
Novelmore - Pyralia, Bar Maid
Open Season: Scared Silly – Rosie, Marcia
Polly Pocket – Lila Draper, Miss Betts, Susie, Andre Anderson, Sun, Brandon, Guard (Female), Newswoman, Cheryl, Cordelia, Jane
Pucca – Chief, Voice Talent
Quest for Zhu – Pipsqueak
Rainbow Ruby – Gina
Sabrina's Secret Life – Margaux, Additional Voices
Sara Solves It – Sara
Skechers – Mariko (2008–2013)
Slugterra – Beatrice "Trixie" Sting, Blue-Haired Old Woman, Woman Dodging Slugs, Trini, Woman Fawning Over Eli (2012–present)
Slugterra: Ghoul from Beyond – Beatrice "Trixie" Sting
Slugterra: Return of the Elementals – Beatrice "Trixie" Sting
Slugterra: Slug Fu Showdown – Beatrice "Trixie" Sting, Sally, Shorty
Slugterra: Eastern Caverns – Beatrice "Trixie" Sting, Outlaw Girl, Flower
Sonic Prime – Amy Rose
Strawberry Shortcake's Berry Bitty Adventures – Cherry Jam (speaking voice), Berrykin Bonnie, Princess Berrykin (singing voice)
Strawberry Shortcake: Berry in the Big City - Raspberry Tart (singing voice), Cherry Jam, Sweet Grapes, Customer #3, Bubblegum, Girl #2, Little Girl
Superbook – Joy Pepper, Servant Girls, Baby
Supernatural Academy - Elda Kristov, Opal, Shan, Carmen 
Supernoobs – Stacy (episode: Noob It or Lose It)
Super Dinosaur – Erin Kingston, Erica Kingston
The Deep – Jess Gorman, Fontaine (episode: Lonesome Jim)
The Little Prince – Jouna in "The Planet of the Gargand" trilogy, episodes 45–47
The Sea Beast - Fen
Unikitty – Misty, Pandeal, Catficorn
Voltron Force – Larmina
We're Lalaloopsy - Dot Starlight (singing voice), Fluffy Pouncy Paws, Alice in Lalaloopsyland, Lady Stillwaiting, Jelly Wiggle Jiggle, Snowy Fairest, Happy Daisy Crown, Whimsy Sugar Puff, Lucky Lil' Bug, Boo Scaredy Cat, Kat Jungle Roar
’’ Lale Ki Lolu - Lale, Various

Anime
Black Lagoon: Roberta's Blood Trail – Fabiola Iglesias
Death Note – Misa Amane
Kingdom series – He Liao Diao
Little Astro Boy – Kinako
Little Battlers Experience – Amy Cohen
Mobile Suit Gundam 00 – Christina Sierra
Mobile Suit Gundam 00 the Movie: A Wakening of the Trailblazer – Christina Sierra
Pokémon - Espeon, Meganium, Skitty, Roselia, Glameow
Puraore! Pride of Orange - Mami Ono
The Girl Who Leapt Through Time – Miyuki Konno

Live-action
Another Life – Iara
Death Note – Misa Amane (English dub)

Death Note 2: The Last Name – Misa Amane (English dub)
Dragon Boys – Kelsey Leung
El Chavo del Ocho – Patty (English dub)
Good Trouble – Ruby
Kill for Me – Zoe
L: Change the World – Misa Amane (English dub)
Life Unexpected – Brynn
Samurai Girl – Attendant
The Secret Circle – Calvin's Niece
The Selection – Tiny Lee
Spectacular! – Janet
The Troop – Shellie
Trial & Error – Clem Tuckett
Life Sentence – Finley

Supergirl – Elizabeth Hawkings
Sonic the Hedgehog – Roundhouse Waitress
Voltron Force – Larmina
Woke – Cindy
You – Kiki

Stage
Avenue Q – Christmas Eve (Arts Club Theatre Company production)
Evita – Peron's Mistress (Vancouver Opera production)

References

External links
 
 

1988 births
Living people
Actresses from Vancouver
Canadian actresses of Chinese descent
Canadian expatriate actresses in the United States
Canadian film actresses
Canadian stage actresses
Canadian television actresses
Canadian voice actresses
University of British Columbia School of Music alumni
20th-century Canadian actresses
21st-century Canadian actresses